Richard Anthony Hutton (born 6 September 1942) is a former English cricketer, who played in five Test matches for the England cricket team in 1971.  A right-handed batsman and right-arm seam bowler, Hutton's bowling was probably his stronger discipline, but he was considered an all-rounder.  He played first-class cricket for Yorkshire County Cricket Club. He is the son of cricketer Len Hutton, described by Wisden Cricketers' Almanack as "one of the greatest batsmen in the history of cricket."

Life and career
He was educated at Repton School, where he developed a reputation as an all-round cricketer, and Christ's College, Cambridge, being awarded a blue at Cambridge.  He played for Yorkshire from 1962 until 1974, and for Transvaal in South Africa.

Hutton made his Test debut in a drawn match against Pakistan in 1971, being promoted to open in the second innings and scoring 58 not out in his maiden Test innings. His highest Test score of 81 came in his last Test match, at The Oval against India.  He shared a century partnership for the seventh wicket with the wicket-keeper Alan Knott, after the Indian spinners did some early damage.  A surprise choice for the World XI tour of Australia in 1971–72, he struggled playing alongside the biggest names in international cricket.

In 1980–81, he toured Bangladesh with the Marylebone Cricket Club (MCC) team. Hutton had a spell as editor of The Cricketer magazine.
 
His father, Sir Leonard Hutton, captained England, while his elder son, Ben Hutton, captained Middlesex in 2005 and 2006. His brother, John, also appeared in first-class cricket.

See also
Marylebone Cricket Club cricket team in Bangladesh in 1980–81

References

External links

1942 births
Living people
English cricketers
England Test cricketers
Yorkshire cricketers
Gauteng cricketers
Cambridge University cricketers
Free Foresters cricketers
Gentlemen cricketers
People educated at Repton School
Alumni of Christ's College, Cambridge
Cricketers from Pudsey
Marylebone Cricket Club cricketers
Presidents of Yorkshire County Cricket Club
D. H. Robins' XI cricketers
T. N. Pearce's XI cricketers
Young England cricketers
Marylebone Cricket Club Under-25s cricketers
Marylebone Cricket Club President's XI cricketers